Eugene Marvin "Gene" Felker (March 4, 1929–March 12, 2013) was an American football end in the National Football League for the Dallas Texans (1952). He played at the collegiate level at the University of Wisconsin–Madison.

See also
List of Dallas Texans (NFL) players

References

External links
Bio from prostatecheckup.com

1929 births
2013 deaths
Players of American football from Milwaukee
American football tight ends
Wisconsin Badgers football players
Dallas Texans (NFL) players